Mahaut is a village on the west coast of Dominica. It has a population of 2,399, and was home to Dominica Colgate-Palmolive (formerly Dominica Coconut Products) until the factory was closed in 2015 after Hurricane Erica.

References

External links

Populated places in Dominica
Saint Paul Parish, Dominica